Eduard Schweizer (1913–2006) was a Swiss New Testament scholar who taught at the University of Zurich for an extended period.  He won the Burkitt Medal for Biblical Studies in 1996.

Biography 
Schweitzer studied Protestant theology at the University of Marburg, the University of Zurich and the University of Basel; in these institutions he was a student of Rudolf K. Bultmann, H. Emil Brunner and Karl Barth. He received his degree in theology in 1938 and became a protestant Pastor in Nesslau. From 1941 he taught New Testament studies at the University of Zurich (1941-1946), the University of Mainz (1946-1949) and the University of Bonn (1949-1950). In 1950 he was appointed to the New Testament chair of the University of Zurich, where he was Rector from 1964 to 1966; he also chaire the Studiorum Novi Testamenti Societas in 1969.

He retired from teaching in 1979 and died in Zurich in 2006.

Works
Jesus (1971)
The Good News According to Mark 
The Good News According to Matthew 
The Good News According to Luke 
The Church as the Body of Christ, 1964
Church Order in the New Testament, 1979,  
The Lord's Supper in the New Testament
The Spirit of God (Holy Spirit )
A Theological Introduction to the New Testament

References

Swiss Christian theologians
Swiss biblical scholars
1913 births
2006 deaths